Sealy Independent School District is a public school district based in Sealy, Texas (USA).  In addition to Sealy, the district serves the towns of San Felipe and Brazos Country serving students in southern Austin County. Sealy Independent School District is the only school district in Austin county with its own police department.

In 2009, the school district was rated "academically acceptable" by the Texas Education Agency. 
On May 7, 2016, voters approved a $43,220,000 Sealy ISD bond package, with 67 percent in favor. This led to the opening of Sealy Elementary School a few years later.

Schools
The district has students in four schools.
Sealy High School (Grades 9-12)
Sealy Junior High School (Grades 6-8)
Sealy Elementary School (Grades EE-5)
Selman Elementary School (Grades EE-5)

References

External links
Sealy ISD

School districts in Austin County, Texas